The following are sign languages reported to be used by at least 10,000 people. Additional languages, such as Chinese Sign Language, are likely to have more signers, but no data is available. Estimates for sign language use are very crude, and definitions of what counts as proficiency are varied. For most sign languages, there are no concrete estimates. For instance, it has been reported there are a million signers in Ethiopia, but there are only a fifth that number of deaf people, less than half of whom are fluent in sign, and in addition it is unknown how many different sign languages they use.

See also 

 List of sign languages
 List of languages by number of native speakers

References 

Lists of languages